South Carolina Highway 901 (SC 901) is a  primary state highway in the U.S. state of South Carolina. It serves as a slower alternate rural route to Interstate 77 (I-77) and the western bypass of Rock Hill.

Route description

SC 901 begins along SC 200 near I-77.  Going north, it hovers to the west and then east of I-77 and then passes through Richburg. After entering York County, it has its own interchange with I-77, then proceeds to form the western bypass of Rock Hill. It is a two-lane rural highway in Fairfield and Chester counties, four lanes wide in York County.

In Rock Hill, SC 901 is known as Heckle Boulevard in honor of H.N. Heckle, who served as South Carolina Department of Transportation District 4 Construction Engineer during the late 1940s through 1960s.

History
Established as a new primary routing in 1930 or 1931, it originally ran from SC 9 near Richburg to the York County line.  In 1933, it was extended north to U.S. Route 21 (US 21).  In 1940, it was extended south to its current southern terminus with SC 22 (today's SC 200).  Between 1949-50, it was briefly truncated south at SC 97.  Between 1974-79, it was extended north to SC 5.  In 1992, it was extended again to its current northern terminus with SC 161/SC 274.

In 2010, SC 901 was widened to four lanes from I-77 to SC 121 funded through the "Pennies for Progress" project fund.

Major intersections

See also

References

External links

SC 901 South Carolina Highway Annex
Former SC 901 Alt. South Carolina Highway Annex

901
Transportation in Fairfield County, South Carolina
Transportation in Chester County, South Carolina
Transportation in York County, South Carolina